The Devil's Hairpin is a 1957 feature film about car racing, filmed in Technicolor and VistaVision, written and directed by Cornel Wilde, who also stars.

Plot
Nick Jargin retired from auto racing undefeated. He is continually goaded by Mike Houston, a sportswriter, to come out of retirement and challenge the top racer of the day, Tony Botari, particularly after egotistically saying in an interview that Botari has no real competition now that he's out of the sport.

Nick's girlfriend is Kelly James, a health club instructor. Kelly wants to be married and have sex, and when a reluctant Nick introduces her to his mother, Mrs. Jargin wants nothing to do with him, blaming Nick for a racing accident that seriously injured her other son, Johnny.

Kelly is even urged by Nick's mother to leave him. She gives him an ultimatum, marry her or else. He declines, so she goes back to former boyfriend Danny Rhinegold, who now runs Botari's racing team.

In the 100-lap race that takes them along rural roads, Nick takes the lead, with his brother Johnny's help on the crew. Botari is nearly in an accident in the dangerous "Devil's Hairpin" turn, so Nick slows down to help Botari steer clear of it. A self-sacrificing gesture is rare for him, so after the race, Kelly accepts when Nick finally proposes to her.

Cast
 Cornel Wilde as Nick Jargin
 Jean Wallace as Kelly James
 Mary Astor as Mrs. Jargin
 Arthur Franz as Danny Rhinegold
 Morgan Jones as Chico Martinez
 Gerald Milton as Houston
 Paul Fix as Doc Addams
 Larry Pennell as Johnny Jargin

Production
Filming took place in March 1957.

The racing scenes were shot at Paramount Ranch Raceway.

See also
 List of American films of 1957

References

External links

1957 films
American auto racing films
Films directed by Cornel Wilde
Paramount Pictures films
1950s English-language films
1950s American films